Umbrías is a municipality located in the province of Ávila, Castile and León, Spain. According to the 2004 census (INE), the municipality has a population of 152 inhabitants.

References

Municipalities in the Province of Ávila